Water-carts may refer to:

 A type of railway tender
 A Furphy water cart